The Yonkers Military Institute was a United States military academy located in Yonkers, New York.

Education in Yonkers, New York

From an albumen photograph measuring 15.25" x 12.75" and dating to circa 1862 the class and presumably its instructors and leaders are pictured with the Institute behind.  A legend along the bottom identifies the scene as N. W. Starr's Commercial and Collegiate Institute, Yonkers New York. Photographed by Stacy, 691 Broadway.  According to a period publications the school was established in 1854 and moved to Port Chester in 1874.  Figures associated with the Institute were Frederick Norton Freeman and Col. John W. Hinsdale of the 3rd North Carolina.